Seydouba Bangoura  is a Guinean football midfielder  who played for Guinea in the 1980 African Cup of Nations.

Bangoura was a key part of Hafia FC's squad that won the continental championship three times in the 1970s. After his playing career ended, he became a spokesperson for a local bauxite mining business.

References

External links

11v11 Profile

https://www.madinamen.com/2018/09/20/la-legende-du-hafia-football-club-lage-dor-du-football-guineen/

Guinean footballers
Guinea international footballers
1980 African Cup of Nations players
Living people
Association football midfielders
Year of birth missing (living people)